Rock 'n' Rodent is a 1967 Tom and Jerry short (though the year of copyright is 1966) directed by Abe Levitow and produced by Chuck Jones, and featured music by Carl Brandt. The title is a pun on "rock and roll", despite the music played being jazz. Animation was supervised by Ben Washam, Dick Thompson, Tom Ray, Don Towsley and Ken Harris.

Plot
In Tom and Jerry's penthouse apartment room on the 20th floor of a 30-story apartment building around 10:00 PM, Tom finishes reading a book and prepares to sleep, setting his wind-up alarm clock to ring in the morning. Unfortunately for Tom, this is also time for Jerry to get up. The mouse's alarm-watch rings and Jerry showers (using a wrench on a pipe) and grooms himself before setting out for a tiny elevator in the wall. He hears Tom snoring and stops briefly (with a close-up of Tom's feet) before he enters the elevator and descends to a club with a sign that says "Le Cellar Smoqué" ("The Smoky Cellar" in French) displayed at its entrance.

Jerry arrives at the bar and has a martini (of which he only eats the cheese on the toothpick, leaving the bartender to drink the rest of the martini). Then, Jerry begins playing the drums with a jazz quartet, which puts the club into full swing.

Shortly afterward, being woken up by the noise, Tom opens the elevator, only to get blasted by the music. He tries to block the elevator doors with a pillow, but it's not enough to stop the noise. He lowers a hose into the elevator shaft in hopes of drowning out the noise. His smug laughter is interrupted by an angry dog that drags Tom downstairs and throws him into his flooded apartment room.

Dripping wet, Tom goes back to his apartment room and decides to stop the noise at its source by grabbing some tools and heading down to the basement through the air vents. Hearing the music through the floor, Tom saws a hole in the floor and uses a plunger, but the music is coming from a radio, and to make matters worse, the angry dog (whom the radio belonged to) pulls Tom up through the floor and punches him back up to his 10th floor apartment room through the floors and his bed.

Now completely bruised and sleep deprived, Tom cries hysterically and puts bigger corks in his ears, wraps up his head with first-aid bandages and tries to settle down to sleep. At that very moment the music stops, causing an elated Tom to wake up with a start, unravel the bandages and pop the corks out. A tired Jerry is seen leaving the elevator toward his mousehole.

Tom gleefully goes back to sleep, only to be awoken seconds later by his ringing alarm clock he had set before. However, having been woken up by the noise, Jerry turns on the light in his Mouse hole, peeks out, and signals to Tom to turn off the alarm clock with a shush, but this hypocritical action from Jerry immediately causes Tom to lose his mind (since Jerry kept him up all the night). Tom screams loudly and runs straight out through the wall, leaving a Tom-shaped hole in the wall. A confused Jerry shrugs it off, thinking that Tom's gone bonkers and imitates a Charlie Chaplin silent walk before going back to sleep.

Crew
Animation: Ben Washam, Dick Thompson, Tom Ray, Don Towsley, & Ken Harris.
Layouts: Don Morgan
Backgrounds: Philip DeGuard
Vocal Effects: Mel Blanc, June Foray & William Hanna
Story: Bob Ogle
Music: Carl Brandt
Design Consultant: Maurice Noble
Production Supervised by Les Goldman
Produced by Chuck Jones
Directed by Abe Levitow

External links

1967 short films
1967 animated films
1967 films
Films directed by Abe Levitow
Tom and Jerry short films
1960s American animated films
1967 comedy films
Animated films without speech
Jazz films
Metro-Goldwyn-Mayer short films
Metro-Goldwyn-Mayer animated short films
MGM Animation/Visual Arts short films
1960s English-language films